Suo Chao is a fictional character in Water Margin, one of the Four Great Classical Novels in Chinese literature. Nicknamed "Impatient Vanguard", he ranks 19th among the 36 Heavenly Spirits, the first third of the 108 Stars of Destiny.

Background
The novel depicts Suo Chao as seven chi tall and striking in appearance with a round face, big ears, squarish mouth and a beard which nearly obscures his face. He is a senior military officer under the prefect Governor Liang Shijie of Daming Prefecture (present-day Daming County, Hebei). As he is impatient in battles, often charging ahead of his men, he is nicknamed "Impatient Vanguard". His combat weapon is a large glazed battle axe.

Contest with Yang Zhi
Yang Zhi, exiled to Daming prefecture as a mitigated sentence for killing a street nuisance in the imperial capital Dopngjing, catches the attention of Liang Shijie. Liang knows he is a good warrior and wants to tap his service. He arranges for Yang to joust with Zhou Jin, one of his better officers, confident that Yang would prove himself deserving of a post in front of all his military men. As expected, Yang beats Zhou Jin easily. Feeling humiliated by the outright defeat of his martial arts student, Suo Chao steps forward and challenges Yang Zhi to a duel. Liang approves the fight. Neither Suo nor Yang could beat the other in the horseback contest. Impressed by their dazzling fight, Liang promotes them to the same rank. Suo and Yang become good friends.

Becoming an outlaw
Liangshan Marsh's Song Jiang leads a military attack on Daming to rescue Lu Junyi and Shi Xiu, who are imprisoned by Liang Shijie. Suo Chao comes out to battle with Liangshan's Qin Ming on horseback. Han Tao fires an arrow, injuring Suo  in his left arm and forcing him to retreat into the city.

The Liangshan force returns to the marsh for some time as Song Jiang has fallen critically ill. Upon recovery, Song returns with his troops for a second attack. It is winter and has been snowing hard. Song comes out of his camp, pretending to survey the enemy's fortification work. Seeing that Song is thinly protected, Suo Chao charges out of the city and chases after him. The pursuit leads him to a pit covered with snow. Suo falls into it and is captured. Song Jiang treats him with his respect, convincing him to join Liangshan.

Campaigns and death
Suo Chao is appointed as one of the Eight Tiger Cub Vanguard Generals of the Liangshan cavalry after the 108 Stars of Destiny came together in what is called the Grand Assembly. He participates in the campaigns against the Liao invaders and rebel forces in Song territory following amnesty from Emperor Huizong for Liangshan.

In the battle of Hangzhou in the campaign against Fang La, Suo Chao attacks the city‘s north gate, where he runs into the enemy general Shi Bao. Feigning defeat, Shi lures Suo to chase him. Then he suddenly turns back and kills Suo Chao, who is caught off guard. After Fang's rebellion is snuffed out, Suo Chao is awarded the posthumous title "Martial Gentleman of Loyalty".

References
 
 
 
 
 
 
 

36 Heavenly Spirits
Fictional characters from Hebei